Sir Michael Mitchell (died 1699) was an Anglo-Irish politician. 

Mitchell was Sheriff of Dublin City in 1683. Between 1691 and 1693 he was Lord Mayor of Dublin, the first Protestant to be appointed to the role after the collapse of James II of England's Jacobite regime in Ireland. In 1692 he was elected as a Member of Parliament for Dublin City, serving until 1693.

References

Year of birth unknown
1699 deaths
17th-century Anglo-Irish people
High Sheriffs of Dublin City
Irish knights
Irish MPs 1692–1693
Lord Mayors of Dublin
Members of the Parliament of Ireland (pre-1801) for County Dublin constituencies